In Taiwan, all motor vehicles are required to register and display its vehicle registration plates. The plates are issued and managed by the Ministry of Transportation and Communications (MoTC). The vehicle registration numbers in Taiwan contains Latin alphabets (A to Z), Arabic numerals (0 to 9) and dash (–); some special types also contain Chinese characters.

Types of number plate 
Taiwan's current number plate system uses Latin letters with Arabic numerals. There are many types of number plate used in Taiwan, they are:

 The plates of military vehicles and agricultural machines are not managed by the MoTC.
 Until 1 January 2007, plates were identified as having been issued under the jurisdiction of either Taiwan Province, Taipei City, Kaohsiung City, Kinmen County or Lienchiang County. Since that time, the legends identifying the place of issuance have been removed—plates display only registration numbers—but the plates are still issued separately by each jurisdiction.
 1992-Series License Plate is similar to North American plates: The size (320 × 150 mm) and the format. However it used "Mexico Mode" rather than "US Mode": One national numbering system, such that serials are not duplicated in multiple Jurisdiction: Taipei City issued "AD-3608", the other four jurisdiction would not issue "AD-3608" anymore. There won't be the problem that two or more jurisdictions all have "AD-3608". So the legends identifying the place of issuance is not so important. And License Plate Scanning and Identifying Systems in Taiwan also ignore it.  Actually, there's a rule of numbering of different jurisdiction: such as "XY-****" can only be issued by Kaohsiung City, "WZ-****" can only be issued by Lienchiang County.

 On 17 December 2012, Taiwanese government started issuing new registration plates. The main changes are: add an additional digit and enhance the security features of the plate.

Light vehicles
The definition of light vehicles in Taiwan is: Motor vehicles having a permissible maximum weight NOT exceeding 3,500 kg and NOT more than nine seats including the driver's seat.

Heavy vehicles
The definition of heavy vehicles in Taiwan is: Motor vehicles having a permissible maximum weight exceeding 3,500 kg and/or more than nine seats including the driver's seat.

Motorcycles

Special use plates

Out of Vehicle registration plates 
The following table shows the status of the ban on the English letters of the current circulation number plates: (Bold text indicates that it has been banned)

References

External links

 License plate rules of the issuing office in Taipei City

Taiwan
Transportation in Taiwan
Vehicle registration plates of Taiwan
Vehicles of Taiwan